Kuchai  is a village in the Kuchai CD block in the Seraikela Sadar subdivision of the Seraikela Kharsawan district in the Indian state of Jharkhand.

Geography

Location

Area overview
The area shown in the map has been described as “part of the southern fringe of the Chotanagpur plateau and is a hilly upland tract”. 75.7% of the population lives in the rural areas and 24.3% lives in the urban areas.

Note: The map alongside presents some of the notable locations in the district. All places marked in the map are linked in the larger full screen map.

Civic administration
There is a police station at Kuchai.

The headquarters of Kuchai CD block are located at Kuchai village.

Demographics
According to the 2011 Census of India, Kuchai had a total population of 1,315, of which 738 (56%) were males and 577 (44%) were females. Population in the age range 0–6 years was 185. The total number of literate persons in Kuchai was 727 (64.34% of the population over 6 years).

(*For language details see Kuchai block#Language and religion)

Transport
Rajkharsawan railway station on the Tatanagar-Bilaspur section of the Howrah-Nagpur-Mumbai line is located nearby.

Education
Government High School Kuchai is a Hindi-medium coeducational institution established in 1979. It has facilities for teaching from class IX to class XII. The school has a playground and a library with 1,100 books.

Project Balika High School Kuchai is a Hindi-medium girls only institution established in 1982. It has facilities for teaching in classes IX and X. The school has a library with 100 books.

Model School Kuchai is an English-medium coeducational institution established in 2012. It has facilities for teaching from class VI to class XII.

References

Villages in Seraikela Kharsawan district